Joujouka may refer to:

 Jajouka or Joujouka, a village in Morocco
 Master Musicians of Joujouka a musical group from the village of Jajouka (Zahjouka) Morocco.
 Joujouka (band), a Japanese techno group